Route 210 is a collector road in the Canadian province of Nova Scotia.

It is located in Lunenburg County and the Region of Queens Municipality, connecting Middlefield on Trunk 8 to Newcombville on Route 325

Communities
 Greenfield (Middlefield - Greenfield - Wellington)
 Chelsea (Upper Chelsea - Chelsea)
 Newcombville

See also
List of Nova Scotia provincial highways

References

Nova Scotia provincial highways
Roads in Lunenburg County, Nova Scotia
Roads in the Region of Queens Municipality